Alexander Solomonovich Kompaneyets (Russian: Александр Соломонович Компанеец) was born on January 4, 1914, in Ekaterinoslav, Russian Empire (now Dnipro, Ukraine) and died on August 19, 1974, in Palanga, Lithuania. He was a prominent physicist, author of a number of textbooks, and collaborator on the Soviet atomic bomb project who lived mainly in Moscow.

Life 
Kompaneyets was a student of Lev Landau in Kharkiv in the 1930s, where he dealt with solid state physics (electrical conductivity in metals and semiconductors). In 1936 he received his doctorate (candidate title) and habilitated in 1939 (Russian doctorate). He was a professor at the Institute of Chemical Physics at the Russian Academy of Sciences in Moscow (where he worked from 1946 until the end of his life) and is best known for his introductory textbook on theoretical physics. He also dealt with the physics of detonation, which he wrote about in a book with Yakov Zeldovich, and generally about gases at high temperatures.

In 1956, he published a work  on the movement of charged particles (electrons) in intense radiation fields (Fokker–Planck equation with inverse Compton scattering (Comptonization), Kompaneyets' equation), which had arisen from secret work in the Soviet atomic bomb project and became important in the 1960s in works by Zeldovich and Rashid Sunyaev on the coupling of radiation and matter in the early universe (see also Sunyaev–Zeldovich effect). In the nuclear weapons program, he worked among others, Zeldovich since the 1940s (at the Institute of Chemical Physics), even at the theoretical examination (from 1948) of the early proposals (1946) of Zeldovich, Isaak Gurevich, Isaac Jakovlevic Pomeranchuk and Yulii Khariton on the hydrogen bomb.  Kompaneyets dealt with many areas of theoretical physics, from chemical kinetics to biophysics.

Publications 
 Landau, Kompaneyets: The electrical conductivity of metals, 1935
 Kompaneyets: Theoretical Physics, Dover 1962
 Kompaneyets: Theoretical Physics, Geest and Portig Academic Publishing Company 1969
 Kompaneyets: What is Quantum Mechanics? , Academic Publishing Company, Leipzig 1967 and Harri Deutsch, Frankfurt am Main 1967
 Kompaneyets: Statistical Laws in Physics, Leipzig, Teubner 1972
 Zeldovich, Kompaneyets: Theory of Detonation, Moscow 1955, Academic Press 1960

References 

 КОМПАНЕЕЦ Александр Соломонович (Entry in the Российская еврейская энциклопедия, Russian, accessed January 9, 2020)

External links 
 Russian biography
 Theoretical Physics: Second Edition, at Barnes and Noble
 A.S. Kompaneyets at WorldCat

Russian physicists

1914 births
1974 deaths